Jan Bosschaert (born 15 December 1957) is a Belgian comics artist, painter and illustrator, best known for the comic series Sam and Jaguar, and his illustrations for the books of Marc De Bel.

Biography
Jan Bosschaert was born in Borgerhout in Flanders in 1957. He was raised in Wijnegem, close to the forest, in a house with a large garden. He spend most of his free time drawing. He made his first comic when he was about 10, and continued in the next years with comics in different genres, ranging from Sherlock Holmes stories to his own version of Lucky Luke. One of his comics, about two senior scouts, he shows to established comics creator Eddy Ryssack, whose main advice is to make sure everything is well documented. He also loved the work of André Franquin which he discovered at the age of 14 at a comics fair in Brussels.

His puberty was a rather unhappy period, where Bosschaert withdrew into his own world and into music. He listened to artists like Tom Waits or Jackson Browne, but kept on drawing. When he was 18 years old, he visited comics author Pom. Seeing the poverty the author lives in is quite a shock, but it didn't stop him of becoming an artist himself.

When he studied at the Sint-Lukasinstituut, the Art Academy of Brussels, he discovered the work of illustrator Ever Meulen, a former student of the same school, which greatly influenced him. Another great influence was Arzach, the textless comic by Moebius. Influences outside the world of comics came from the dominant styles of his youth, punk and new wave music.

Bosschaert published his first work in (À Suivre), and produced his first published comic album in 1982 with Ikarus, but his breakthrough was the political-satirical comic strip Pest in 't Paleis (Pest in the Palace), which appeared in HUMO in 1983. But Bosschaert quit making comics and worked for the rest of the decade primarily as an illustrator for different magazines, including Playboy, and authors like Hugo Claus. His main illustrative work appeared first in publications of the Flemish television network VRT, and later in publications of publisher Altiora and popular children's book author Marc De Bel, whom he considers as a kindred spirit and an older brother.

He also continued to make paintings, mainly female nudes and erotic works. Bosschaert is a purely figurative painter, who prefers clarity over concepts.

His first longer running comic series started in 1990, with stories by Marc Legendre. Sam tells the adventures of an adolescent girl working in a small garage. The series came to a halt after 8 albums though, and translations were unsuccessful. While Bosschaert tried to limit his purely commercial work to a few jobs a year, he made an exception for people he feels connected to. He created King Kong Kooks as a catalogue annex comic for fashion designer Walter Van Beirendonck.

More international recognition followed from 2001 on, when he collaborated with comics author Jean Dufaux on Jaguar, a fantasy series published by Casterman and translated in French and Spanish. Local success in Flanders came when he collaborates with comedian Urbanus on De Geverniste Vernepelingskes, a series which parodies famous Belgians, including the two authors.

Bosschaert illustrated album covers for musical artists like The Paranoiacs, Pitti Polak, Plastic Bertrand and Jan De Wilde.

Bibliography
This bibliography contains only his comics, a list of his illustrations is not included.

Awards
 1983: Provinciale Prijs voor de Schilderkunst (Provincial Award for Painting) of the province of Antwerp, Belgium
 1991: Bronzen Adhemar, Turnhout, Belgium
 2003: Best Author (Dutch language) at the Prix Saint-Michel, Brussels, Belgium

Notes

External links

 Homepage (French and Dutch)
 Comiclopedia page
 Biography at Arcadia, one of his publishers (Dutch)
 A page about his illustrations of children's books (Dutch)

1957 births
Living people
People from Borgerhout
Belgian comics artists
Belgian painters
Belgian illustrators
Belgian children's book illustrators
Belgian caricaturists
Album-cover and concert-poster artists